This is a list of notable casserole dishes. A casserole, probably from the archaic French word casse meaning a small saucepan, is a large, deep dish used both in the oven and as a serving vessel. The word is also used for the food cooked and served in such a vessel, with the cookware itself called a casserole dish or casserole pan.

Casserole dishes

 
 
 
  – a popular way of cooking salted cod (bacalhau) in Portugal
 
 
 
  – named after the place of its invention, the Divan Parisiennne Restaurant in the New York Chatham Hotel
 
 
  - Rice baked with béchamel sauce. It is a Japanese Western dish similar to gratin.
 
 
 
 
 
 
 
 
  (potatoes gratiné)
 
  – typically contains a starch, a meat or other protein, and a canned or frozen vegetable, mixed with canned soup
  – a Finnish food traditionally eaten at Christmas
 
 
 
 
 
 
 
  – made from groats and farmer cheese
 
 
 
 
 
 
 
 
 
 
 
 
 
  – sometimes prepared as a casserole
 
 
 
 
 
  – popular in Quebec and New England
 
 
 
 
 
 
 
 
 
 
 
 
 
 
 
 Zucchini slice

Gallery

See also

 Baking
 Dutch oven – may be called casserole dishes in English speaking countries other than the United States
 Lists of prepared foods
 Marmite (cooking dish) – a traditional crockery casserole dish found in France
 Potluck – an event that sometimes includes casserole dishes

References

Casserole dishes
Casserole